Maurice Ntounou (born 13 September 1972) is a Congolese footballer. He played in 12 matches for the Congo national football team from 1992 to 1999. He was also named in Congo's squad for the 1992 African Cup of Nations tournament.

References

1972 births
Living people
Republic of the Congo footballers
Republic of the Congo international footballers
1992 African Cup of Nations players
Association football defenders
Sportspeople from Brazzaville